The American Institute of Floral Designers (AIFD), established in 1965, is the oldest and largest non-profit organization dedicated to recognizing and promoting the art of floral design as a professional career.  Its more than 1200 members engage in a variety of professional programs and activities through a network of six (6) regional chapters throughout the United States and Canada.

Membership 
To receive accreditation as a full member, and use the designation 'AIFD', candidates must demonstrate their design artistry by creating five (5) arrangements in specific categories which are announced during the Accreditation Evaluation testing. Designs are evaluated by members of the AIFD National Membership Committee for the following attributes:
Category Interpretation 
Scale (Proportion) 
Balance (Physical and Visual) 
Line (Movement and Rhythm) 
Color (Balance, Harmony and Rhythm) 
Creativity 
Unity (Harmony & Texture) 
Focal Emphasis 
Depth 
Mechanics (Professional Application)

Applicants also need to successfully complete a written test which covers the elements and principles of floral design and fresh flower care and handling.

To maintain membership, accredited designers are required to document continuing education in the field.

References

External links 
The American Institute of Floral Designers (AIFD)

Professional associations based in the United States
Arts organizations established in 1965
Floral organizations